Main Street Historic District is a national historic district located at Cuba in Allegany County, New York. The district consists of nine acres and includes 31 contributing buildings.  It encompasses the village of Cuba's commercial district, which includes a small number of prominent religious, civic, and residential structures.  The structures date from about 1835 to about 1948.

It was listed on the National Register of Historic Places in 1999.

References

Historic districts on the National Register of Historic Places in New York (state)
Historic districts in Allegany County, New York
National Register of Historic Places in Allegany County, New York
1835 establishments in New York (state)